Wah Kee (华记) is a secret society based in Malaysia and Singapore since the nineteenth century. 

According to the History of Wah Kee, Wah Kee (华记) was created in Singapore by Su Guanghua (苏广华). His associate Zhao Guangheng (赵广恒) created Guang Kee (广记) in Guangzhou, China, while Guan Fusheng (关福胜) created Sheng Kee (胜记) in Thailand, and Zhang Xiongjie (张雄杰) created Jie Kee (杰记) in Vietnam.

In the 1950s, they operated openly in the area around Bentong and placed a member on the local council of Jemaluang.  During this time, they were commonly associated with the Malaysian Chinese Association, with politician D. R. Seenivasagam going so far as to describe this connection in Parliament.

In recent times, they are mainly in the Selangor, Kuala Lumpur, Melaka, Penang, Pahang, Negeri Sembilan, Sarawak, Perak and other areas. In Singapore, Wah Kee is mainly in the China Town area. The triad also have some branches in Australia, Thailand, Vietnam, China, Hong Kong, the United States, Canada and New Zealand.

The Philippine Center on Transnational Crime has stated that while the Wah Kee do not operate as a traditional triad per se, they are heavily involved in heroin trafficking in the region.

See also

 Secret society

References

Secret societies in Singapore
Organized crime groups in Malaysia
Organised crime groups in Singapore
Triad groups